was a Japanese water polo player. He competed in the men's tournament at the 1932 Summer Olympics.

References

External links
 

1911 births
Year of death missing
Japanese male water polo players
Olympic water polo players of Japan
Water polo players at the 1932 Summer Olympics
Place of birth missing
20th-century Japanese people